Xerini is a tribe of ground squirrels occurring in Africa and Asia. With the tribes Marmotini (Holarctic ground squirrels) and Protoxerini (African tree squirrels), they form the subfamily Xerinae. There are five living genera—Xerus, the unstriped ground squirrel; Euxerus, the striped ground squirrel; Geosciurus, the Cape and mountain ground squirrels; Atlantoxerus, containing the living Barbary ground squirrel of North Africa and some extinct species; and Spermophilopsis, containing the long-clawed ground squirrel of Central Asia.

The squirrels live in open woodlands, grasslands, or rocky country. They are diurnal and terrestrial, living in burrows. Their diet is roots, seeds, fruits, pods, grains, insects, small vertebrates and bird eggs. They live in colonies similar to North American prairie dogs, and have similar behavior. If kept as pets, they run free as house cats do, otherwise farmers consider them pests. Breeding in South African ground squirrels is asynchronous and there is no specific period of breeding although very few litters are seen above the ground in the months of July to October. Gestation period lasts for 48 days and the young ones are weaned after 52 days. There are one to three babies per litter. A female becomes sexually mature when she is 10 months old and a male matures at the age of 8 months. Although a female has the capability to breed throughout the year, less than 10% reproduce more than one litter in a year.

The South African ground squirrel does not hibernate. These squirrels are very social and live in groups with about 1 to 3 females and 2 to 3 males. Sometimes, the number of males can exceed up to 9 with some sub-adult females. An interesting thing about this breed is that mature males like to form their own groups and there can be 19 to 20 individuals in one group. These groups are called bands.

Their home range is shared with other groups which is actually quite a surprising thing, since in case of most of the mammals there is generally an extremely tough competition to get the female. The group-living instinct of this species gives it a survival opportunity from predators overweighing the disadvantage of breeding opportunities which come from competition.

Species
Extant species
Genus Atlantoxerus
Barbary ground squirrel, Atlantoxerus getulus
Genus Euxerus
Striped ground squirrel, Euxerus erythropus
Genus Geosciurus
Cape ground squirrel, Geosciurus inauris
Mountain ground squirrel, Geosciurus princeps
Genus Xerus
Unstriped ground squirrel, Xerus rutilus
Genus Spermophilopsis
Long-clawed ground squirrel, Spermophilopsis leptodactylus
Fossil species

 Genus Heteroxerus
 †Heteroxerus grivensis
 Genus Aragoxerus
 †Aragoxerus ignis

References
Thorington,  R.W., Jr. and Hoffmann, R.S. 2005. Family Sciuridae. Pp. 754–818 in Wilson, D.E. and  Reeder, D.M. (eds.). Mammal Species of the World: a taxonomic and  geographic reference. 3rd ed.  Baltimore: The Johns Hopkins University Press, 2 vols., 2142 pp. 

Xerini
Mammals of Africa
Mammal tribes